Kanit Sarasin (born 25 December 1964), nicknamed Pe, is a Thai host and actor.

Biography 

Kanit is the youngest son of Pao and Thawika Sarasin. He graduated from Chulalongkorn University Demonstration School, Chiang Mai University and Boston University. He has 2 sons named Gorawit and Anapat.

After He graduated, he worked in Charoen Pokphand, Standard Chartered PLC. He is an actor and the host of the TV programs named Are You Smarter than a 5th Grader? and Metrosexual

See also
Sarasin family

References

Kanit Sarasin
Boston University alumni
Living people
1964 births
Kanit Sarasin